Godiva or Lady Godiva was an Anglo-Saxon noblewoman who, according to legend, rode naked through the streets of Coventry, in England, in order to gain a remission of the oppressive taxation imposed by her husband on his tenants.

Godiva or Lady Godiva may also refer to:

Arts and entertainment
Films and television
 Lady Godiva (1911 film), an American silent historical drama film
 Lady Godiva (1921 film), a German silent historical drama film
 Lady Godiva (2008 film), a British romantic comedy film
 Godiva's, a Canadian television series depicting a small restaurant in Vancouver

Music
 Godiva's Hymn, traditional drinking song for engineers
 Godiva Festival, an annual festival of pop music held in July in the War Memorial Park, Coventry, England
 Godiva (album), a 2003 album by Godiva
 "Lady Godiva" (song), a 1966 song by Peter and Gordon, notably covered by Alex Day
 "Godiva", a song by Heaven Shall Burn from the 2013 album Veto

Other arts
 Godiva (comics), the name of three DC Comics characters
 "Godiva" (poem), an 1842 poem by Alfred Tennyson
 Lady Godiva (painting), an 1898 painting by John Collier

Others
 Godiva (gastropod), a genus of nudibranchs (sea slugs)
 Godiva (horse), a racehorse
 3018 Godiva, an asteroid
 Godiva Chocolatier, a chocolate maker
 Godiva device, an experimental nuclear reactor at the Los Alamos National Laboratory that caused a criticality accident in 1954

See also
 Lady Godiva syndrome or exhibitionism
 Lady Godiva Memorial Bnad (sic), organization of University of Toronto engineering students
 Lady Godiva of Coventry, an American historical film released in 1955
 Lady Godiva Rides Again, British comedy film released in 1951
 "Lady Godiva's Operation", a 1968 song by The Velvet Underground
 Lady Godiva in popular culture